Ridler is the surname of:

Anne Ridler (1912-2001), British poet and editor
David Ridler (born 1976), British footballer and team manager
Horace Ridler (1892–1969), British sideshow tattooed man
Nick Ridler, British engineer
Tony Ridler (born 1954), Welsh darts player
Vivian Ridler (1913–2009), English printer, typographer and scholar

See also
Ridler Award, presented at the annual Detroit Autorama for best in show custom-built car